Hydrox, a gas mixture of hydrogen and oxygen, was used as a breathing gas in very deep diving. It allows divers to descend several hundred metres.

Precautions are necessary when using hydrox, since mixtures containing more than a few percent of both oxygen and hydrogen are explosive if ignited. Hydrogen is the lightest gas (half the weight of helium) but still has a narcotic potential and may cause hydrogen narcosis.

History
Although the first reported use of hydrogen seems to be Antoine Lavoisier (1743–1794) experimenting on guinea pigs, the actual first uses of this gas in diving are usually attributed to trials by the Swedish engineer, Arne Zetterström in 1945.

Zetterström showed that hydrogen was perfectly usable to great depths. Following a fault in using the surface equipment, he died during a demonstration dive. The study of hydrogen was not resumed until several years later by the United States Navy and by the Compagnie maritime d'expertises (Comex), initially during their Hydra I and Hydra II experiments, in 1968 and 1969. Comex subsequently developed procedures allowing dives between 500 and 700 metres (1650 to 2300 feet) in depth, while breathing gas mixtures based on hydrogen, called hydrox (hydrogen-oxygen) or hydreliox (hydrogen-helium-oxygen).

Memorial dives 

In July 2012, after about a year of preparation and planning, members of the Swedish Historical Diving Society and the Royal Institute of Technology Diving Club, performed a series of hydrox dives in memory of Arne Zetterström, who was accidentally killed during the ascent from his record dive using hydrox in August 1945. The memorial dives were performed using the same breathing mixture of 96% hydrogen and 4% oxygen as was developed and tested by Zetterström in the 1940s.

Use
Hydrox may be used for combating high pressure nervous syndrome (HPNS), commonly occurring during very deep dives.

This dive made him "the deepest diver in the world".

Biochemical decompression
The United States Navy has evaluated the use of bacterial flora to speed decompression from hydrox diving.

See also
Argox
Heliox
Hydreliox
Nitrox
Trimix

References

External links
COMEX Hydra - Hyperbaric Experimental Centre
Diving With Gas Mixes Other Than Air, Larry "Harris" Taylor
Fact sheet and links

Breathing gases
Hydrogen technologies